Bayada or Khirbet al-Baiyada is an Arab village in Israel's Haifa District. The village is in the Wadi Ara area of the northern Triangle, 4 kilometers northeast of Umm al-Fahm. Since 1996, it has been under the jurisdiction of the Ma'ale Iron local council. In mid-2016 the population of Bayada was 486, all of whom are Muslims. The vast majority of the residents are members of the Jabbarin clan (Who also live in nearby Salim and Musheirifa) and most of the residents work in construction and other related jobs. Bayada started as part of Musheirifa and later became a separate village.

Bayada is the feminine form of the word white in Arabic. The village was so named because of the bright soil found in the area.

Geography
Bayada is one of the smallest villages in the region and is located on a hill overlooking Wadi Ara. The village is located between the Umm al-Fahm mountain ridge and the Menashe Heights.

History
The village was originally a neighborhood of Musheirifa.

During the 1948 Arab–Israeli War the village and the surrounding area came under Iraqi control. In March 1949 Jordanian forces replaced the Iraqi forces in Wadi Ara. On 3 April 1949 Israel and Jordan signed an armistice agreement, in which Israel would receive the Wadi Ara area and on 20 May Israeli forces took control of the village.

Bayada is one of the villages of Wadi Ara that lacked municipal status after the establishment of Israel, under the administration of mukhtars (village headmen) who were appointed by the Interior Ministry until 1992 when the Interior Ministry established the Nahal Iron (i.e. Wadi Ara) Regional council .

The locals' objected to the administrative arrangement, and sought independent municipal status for each village. To allay local concerns, the Interior Ministry established an investigative committee to examine other options, and in 1996, decided to split the regional council into two local councils: Ma'ale Iron, which includes Bayada, and Basma.

*In the 2008 census Bayada and Musheirifa were counted together and their population was 3,100

Sports
Bayada and nearby Musheirifa have a joint football team named "Bnei Musheirifa Bayada" which participates in Liga Gimel Jezreel. The team hosts games in a football field located in Barkai.

See also
Arab localities in Israel

References

External links
 Welcome To Kh. al-Baiyada
Survey of Western Palestine, Map 8:    IAA, Wikimedia commons 

Arab localities in Israel
Triangle (Israel)
Wadi Ara